Carlo Jacobsen (10 June 1884 – 17 October 1960) was a Danish art director.

Selected filmography
 The Secret of the Desert (1918)
 A Trip to Mars (1918)
 David Copperfield (1922)
 Little Dorrit (1924)
 Mists of the Past (1925)
 The Clown (1926)

References

Bibliography
 Carl Theodor Dreyer. Four Screenplays. Indiana University Press, 1970.

External links

1884 births
1960 deaths
Danish art directors